The 1990 Laurence Olivier Awards were held in 1990 in London celebrating excellence in West End theatre by the Society of London Theatre. As the previous ceremony was held in 1988, these awards honored productions from both 1989 and 1990, and have been listed as the 1989/90 Laurence Olivier Awards on the Society of London Theatre website since at least 2003.

Winners and nominees
Details of winners (in bold) and nominees, in each award category, per the Society of London Theatre.

Productions with multiple nominations and awards
The following 15 productions received multiple nominations:

 5: Miss Saigon
 4: Ghetto and Racing Demon
 3: Othello, Shadowlands, The Baker's Wife, The Voysey Inheritance and The Wars of the Roses
 2: Buddy, Jeffrey Bernard Is Unwell, Man of the Moment, Return to the Forbidden Planet, Single Spies and Some Americans Abroad

The following three productions received multiple awards:

 3: Racing Demon
 2: Miss Saigon and The Voysey Inheritance

See also
 44th Tony Awards

References

External links
 Previous Olivier Winners – 1989/90

Laurence Olivier Awards ceremonies
Laurence Olivier Awards, 1990
Laurence Olivier Awards
Laurence Olivier Awards